The Muar District is a district in Johor, Malaysia. Muar is located at the mouth of the Muar River, on the coast of the Straits of Malacca.

History 
The district was formerly divided administratively into Bandar Maharani municipality and Tangkak township. Upon upgrade of Tangkak sub-district to full-fledged Tangkak District (initially Ledang), Bandar Maharani is now administered by Muar Municipal Council (formerly South Muar Town Council, later Muar Town Council) under the Muar District Office, while Tangkak of Ledang is administered by Tangkak Town Council (formerly North Muar Town Council) under the Tangkak (formerly Ledang) District Office.

A new administration hub and transportation hub integrated with bus terminal and market called Maharani Sentral are being planned to be built at the location near Muar Bypass in between Jalan Haji Kosai and Jalan Temenggung.

Administrative divisions

Muar District is divided into 12 mukims, which are:
 Ayer Hitam
 Bukit Kepong
 Jalan Bakri
 Jorak
 Lenga
 Muar Town
 Parit Bakar
 Parit Jawa
 Seri Menanti
 Sungai Balang
 Sungai Raya
 Sungai Terap

Towns
 Muar
 Pagoh
 Parit Jawa
 Sungai Balang
 Bukit Kepong
 Bukit Pasir
 Panchor
 Lenga
 Pekan Bakri, Jalan Bakri
 Bukit Naning

Demographics

Federal Parliament and State Assembly Seats

List of Muar district representatives in the Federal Parliament (Dewan Rakyat) 

List of Muar district representatives in the State Legislative Assembly (Dewan Negeri)

Economy
The main economy activities in the district are education, trading, furniture manufacturing, historical tourism and agritourism.

See also
 Districts of Malaysia

Notes

References